Glitch is the third studio album by English singer-songwriter V V Brown, released on 25 September 2015 via Brown's own imprint YOY Records. The album was partially funded via PledgeMusic, with ten percent of all proceeds going towards Save the Children.

Track listing

References

2015 albums
V V Brown albums